Cerocala masaica is a moth of the family Erebidae.

Distribution
It is found in Ethiopia and Kenya.

References

Ophiusina
Moths of Africa
Moths described in 1913